Bruce Charles Baumann (born August 25, 1967) is a former professional American football placekicker in the National Football League and the Arena Football League. He played college football for West Virginia and was acquired through free agency in 1991 by the Miami Dolphins. He was signed by the New England Patriots where he played two seasons.

He is the older brother of Randy Baumann, host of The DVE Morning Show on Pittsburgh's WDVE, and Bryan Baumann, who was a kicker at West Virginia.

Education
Bachelor of Arts, Communication Studies, West Virginia University 1990; Master of Business Administration (Finance), University of Central Florida 1997; Master of Science in Accounting, University of Central Florida 2004.

Post-football career

Chief Financial Officer, U.S. Medical Group of Florida, Inc.; Vice President, 1405 S. Orange Partnership LLP;

References

1967 births
Living people
Sportspeople from Erie, Pennsylvania
Players of American football from Pennsylvania
American football placekickers
West Virginia Mountaineers football players
Miami Dolphins players
New England Patriots players